Quichuana is a genus of hoverflies.

References

Diptera of South America
Hoverfly genera
Eristalinae